This page details the records and statistics of the Copa Sudamericana football tournament. The Copa Sudamericana is an international club tournament played annually in South America. It includes 3-8 teams from all ten CONMEBOL members. It is typically held from August to December and it consists of six stages. The all-time leader in titles won are Argentina's Boca Juniors and Independiente, Brazilian Athletico Paranaense and Ecuadorian Independiente del Valle.

General performances

By club

By nation

Number of participating clubs by country

 Updated until 2023 edition.
Teams in bold: winner of the edition.
Teams in italics: runner-up of the edition.

Clubs

By semifinal appearances
In bold, teams that were finalists that year.

By country

By quarterfinal appearances

By country

Specific group stage records

Best group stage

Worst group stage

Unbeaten sides
Four clubs have won the Copa Sudamericana unbeaten:
Universidad de Chile had 10 wins and 2 draws in 2011
São Paulo had 5 wins and 5 draws in 2012
River Plate had 8 wins and 2 draws in 2014
Defensa y Justicia had 6 wins and 3 draws in 2020

Finals success rate

Four clubs has appeared in the finals of the Copa Sudamericana more than once with a 100% success rate:
Boca Juniors (2004, 2005)
Independiente (2010, 2017)
Athletico Paranaense (2018, 2021)
Independiente del Valle (2019, 2022)
Eleven clubs have appeared in the final once, being victorious on that occasion:
San Lorenzo (2002)
Cienciano (2003)
Pachuca (2006)
Arsenal (2007)
Internacional (2008)
Universidad de Chile (2011)
Santa Fe (2015)
Chapecoense (2016)
Defensa y Justicia  (2020)
On the other end, fifteen clubs have appeared in the finals and have never won the tournament. One of those clubs has appeared in the finals more than once, losing on each occasion:
Atlético Nacional (2002, 2014, 2016)

Consecutive participations
Emelec have the record number of consecutive participations with 8 from 2009 to 2016.

Goals

Biggest wins 
Oriente Petrolero 1–10 Fluminense (May 26, 2022, also largest away win)
Defensor Sporting 9–0 Sport Huancayo (September 16, 2010)

Biggest two leg win 
Alajuelense 2–11 Colo-Colo (2006 Copa Sudamericana)

Consecutive finals
One team has appeared in a record of two consecutive finals:
Boca Juniors (2004, 2005)

Successful defending
Only one club have successfully defended the trophy: Boca Juniors (2005)

References